Norbert Pohlmann (born 20 March 1960) is a computer scientist and a professor at the . He is also chairman of the board of the IT security association TeleTrusT.

Career 
Born in Ratingen, Pohlmann studied electrical engineering from 1981 to 1985, specialising in computer science. He wrote his doctoral thesis on "Possibilities and Limitations of Firewall Systems".

He was managing director at KryptoKom, a company for information security and communication technology, from 1988 to 1999. After a merger with Utimaco Safeware AG, he was a member of the company's board from 1999 to 2003.

Pohlmann was one of the founders of the IT security association TeleTrusT, which has established reliable conditions for trustworthy application of information and communication technologies. He has been member of the board since 1994, and chairman of the board since April 1998. Pohlmann was one of the initiators of the Information Security Solutions Europe (ISSE) and chairman of the ISSE program committee of the ISSE conference.

He is also a member of the board of eco (Association of the Internet Industry) as well as a member of the academic council of the GDD, the German association for data protection and data security. He was a member of the permanent stakeholders' group of the ENISA (European Union Agency for Network and Information Security) from 2005 to 2010.

In the summer term 2013, Pohlmann was a visiting professor at Stanford University.

Awards 
 Rudolf-Thoma Prize of VDE (Association for Electrical, Electronic & Information Technology) for the best final grade in the graduation year 1985
 1997 City of Aachen's Prize for Innovation and Technology for his scientific and entrepreneurial performance.
 2011 Professor of the Year in the category "Engineering / Informatics", awarded by the German students magazine Unicum.

Publications 
 Firewall Architecture for the Enterprise, John Wiley & Sons, Hoboken, USA, 2002 .
 Firewall-Systeme - Sicherheit für Internet und Intranet, E-Mail-Security, Virtual Private Network, Intrusion Detection System, Personal Firewalls MITP-Verlag, Bonn 2003 .
 Virtual Private Network (VPN) MITP-Verlag, Bonn 2003 
 Der IT-Sicherheitsleitfaden MITP-Verlag, Bonn 2006 
 Sicher im Internet: Tipps und Tricks für das digitale Leben'' orell füssli Verlag, Zürich 2010

References

External links 
 
 CV Norbert Pohlmann
 Books by Pohlmann as PDF
 Institute for Internet Security  (Institut für Internetsicherheit an der Westfälischen Hochschule)

German computer scientists
People from Ratingen
1960 births
Living people